Martin Ivanovich Latsis (born Jānis Sudrabs; ; December 14, 1888 – February 11, 1938) was a Latvian Bolshevik revolutionary, Soviet politician, and senior state security officer of the Cheka from Courland (now Latvia).

Life
Born in the family of a Latvian farmworker, Latsis was a member of the Bolshevik faction of the Russian Social Democratic Labour Party from 1905 (an "Old Bolshevik"), an active participant in the Russian Revolutions of 1905–1907 and 1917, a member of the Military Revolutionary Committee, a member of the Collegium of the All-Russia Cheka (1918–1921) and Chairman of the Cheka in Ukraine (1919), and a member of VTsIK. Between 1932 and 1937, Latsis was a director at the Plekhanov Russian Academy of Economics.

Latsis was the author of the book  ("Two Years of Struggle on the Internal Front", Moscow: Gos. izd-vo, 1920), in which he advocated unrestrained violence against class enemies. He boasted of the harsh repressive policies used by the Cheka.

In 1918, while a deputy chief of the Cheka in Ukraine, he called for sentences to be determined not by guilt or innocence but by social class. He is quoted as explaining the Red Terror as follows:

While praising Latsis' abilities, Lenin criticized his advocacy of indiscriminate class terror as "absurd" and risking "untold harm to communism":

On November 29, 1937, during the so-called "Latvian Operation", Latsis was arrested, accused by a commission of NKVD and Prosecutor of the USSR of belonging to a "counter-revolutionary, nationalist organization" and executed in 1938 by shooting in the Butovo firing range.

In 1956, the Military Collegiate of the Supreme Court of USSR politically rehabilitated him.

References

Literature
 Solzhenitsyn, Aleksandr; The Gulag Archipelago, Harper & Row, 660 pp., .
 Gordievsky, Oleg; Andrew, Christopher, KGB: The Inside Story (1990), Hodder & Stoughton. .

External links
 Profile at hrono.ru

1888 births
1938 deaths
People from Cēsis Municipality
People from Kreis Wenden
Old Bolsheviks
Cheka officers
Cheka
Republican Cheka (Ukraine) chairmen
Recipients of the Order of the Red Banner
Latvian Operation of the NKVD
Great Purge victims from Latvia
Executed Latvian people
Soviet rehabilitations
Politicide perpetrators
Soviet war crimes